Parke Apartments, also known as Park Lane Condominium, is a historic apartment building located at Buffalo in Erie County, New York.  It was designed and built in 1924-1925 by the H.L. Stevens & Company and is an early 20th-century high class apartment building modestly styled in the Second Renaissance Revival mode. It is a ten-story, concrete framed masonry building built of cream colored brick with light stone detail in a "T" shaped layout.  Also on the property is a two-story former carriage house.  It was converted from apartments to condominiums in 1977.

It was listed on the National Register of Historic Places in 2007.  It is located in the Elmwood Historic District–East.

Gallery

References

External links

Parke Apartments - U.S. National Register of Historic Places on Waymarking.com
Park Lane Condominium website

Residential buildings on the National Register of Historic Places in New York (state)
Renaissance Revival architecture in New York (state)
Residential buildings completed in 1924
Buildings and structures in Buffalo, New York
Apartment buildings in New York (state)
National Register of Historic Places in Buffalo, New York
Historic district contributing properties in Erie County, New York